Smad nuclear-interacting protein 1 is a protein that in humans is encoded by the SNIP1 gene.

Interactions 

SNIP1 has been shown to interact with EP300.

References

Further reading